In rhetoric, praegnans constructio (or constructio praegnans) is a form of brachylogy in which two clauses or two expressions are condensed into one. The term comes from the Latin term of the same name, which translates to pregnant construction; generally, the construction involves a sentence which uses a verb not expressing motion being followed by a prepositional phrase such as slaughter into the fire, or - alternatively - a motion verb combined with a static prepositional phrase such as throw in the fire. The construction is most commonly found in Greek, but also can be found in a handful of other languages such as Hebrew.

References

 

Rhetoric
Figures of speech